Maria Lvovna Kalmykova (born 14 January 1978 in Ryazan) is a Russian basketball player who competed for the Russian National Team at the 2004 Summer Olympics, winning the bronze medal.

References

1978 births
Living people
Sportspeople from Ryazan
Russian women's basketball players
Basketball players at the 2004 Summer Olympics
Olympic bronze medalists for Russia
Olympic basketball players of Russia
Olympic medalists in basketball
Medalists at the 2004 Summer Olympics